Pterostylis chaetophora, commonly known as the Taree rustyhood, tall rusthood or ruddy hood is a plant in the orchid family Orchidaceae and is endemic to eastern Australia. It has a rosette of leaves at its base and up to twelve reddish-brown flowers with translucent "windows" and a fleshy, reddish-brown, bristly, insect-like labellum.

Description
Pterostylis chaetophora, is a terrestrial,  perennial, deciduous, herb with an underground tuber. Flowering plants have a rosette at the base of the flowering spike but the leaves are usually withered by flowering time. The flowers lean forward and there are three to five stem leaves wrapped around the flowering spike. Flowering occurs from August to November.

Taxonomy and naming
Pterostylis chaetophora was first formally described in 1989 by Mark Clements and David Jones from a specimen collected near Abermain and the description was published in Australian Orchid Research. The specific epithet (chaetophora) is derived from the Ancient Greek word chaite meaning "long hair" and the suffix -phorus meaning "-bearing".

Distribution and habitat
The Taree rustyhood grows in forest with grasses and shrubs in the Taree district and in Queensland.

Conservation
Pterostylis chaetophora is listed as "vulnerable" unde the New South Wales Threatened Species Conservation Act 1995. The main threats to the species are weed invasion, habitat loss and disturbance from road works, rubbish dumping and uncontrolled vehicle access.

References

chaetophora
Endemic orchids of Australia
Orchids of New South Wales
Orchids of Queensland
Plants described in 1989